Arun Kumar Singh or commonly Arun Singh is a former Indian diplomat. He was the Indian Ambassador to the United States from 2015 to 2016. He is now a senior fellow with the Asia program at the German Marshall Fund of the United States. Before taking charge as ambassador in the United States, he served as Ambassador of India to France in Paris. On 8 March 2015, Ministry of External Affairs of India announced its decision to appoint Singh as the next Ambassador of India to the United States.

He is a career Indian Foreign Service officer. He had previously served as Deputy Chief of Mission at the Embassy at Washington D.C. (2008–13), Ambassador to Israel (2005-2008) and as a Joint Secretary to the Ministry of External Affairs Government of India at New Delhi (2000–2005).

Currently, he is a Senior Counsellor at The Cohen Group, a consulting firm in Washington D.C. that provides advice and assistance in marketing and regulatory affairs.

Early life and background
Arun completed his formal education from St. Michael's High School, Patna. Singh joined the Indian Foreign Service in 1979, after completing his master's degree in economics from Delhi University, and teaching at the university for two years.

See also
Harsh V Shringla
Navtej Sarna
Nirupama Rao
Dr. Subrahmanyam Jaishankar

References

Living people
Delhi University alumni
Ambassadors of India to France
Indian Foreign Service officers
Ambassadors of India to Israel
Ambassadors of India to the United States
Year of birth missing (living people)